The House of Borgia (Spanish and) was an Italian-Aragonese Spanish noble family, which rose to prominence during the Italian Renaissance. They were from Valencia, the surname being a toponymic from the town of Borja, then in the Crown of Aragon, in Spain.

The Borgias became prominent in ecclesiastical and political affairs in the 15th and 16th centuries, producing two popes: Alfons de Borja, who ruled as Pope Callixtus III during 1455–1458, and Rodrigo Lanzol Borgia, as Pope Alexander VI, during 1492–1503.

Especially during the reign of Alexander VI, they were suspected of many crimes, including adultery, incest, simony, theft, bribery, and murder (especially murder by arsenic poisoning). Because of their grasping for power, they made enemies of the Medici, the Sforza, and the Dominican friar Girolamo Savonarola, among others. They were also patrons of the arts who contributed to the development of Renaissance art.

The Borgia family stands out in history as being infamously steeped in sin and immorality, yet there is evidence to suggest that this one-dimensional characterization is a result of undeserved contemporary critiques.

History

Early history 
The Borja was a noble house with origin in the town of Borja (Zaragoza) in the then Crown of Aragon. There were numerous unsubstantiated claims that the family was of Jewish origin. These underground rumours were propagated by, among others, Giuliano della Rovere, and the family was frequently described as marranos by political opponents. The rumours have persisted in popular culture for centuries, listed in the Semi-Gotha of 1912.  The family themselves propagated a spurious genealogical descent from a 12th-century claimant to the crown of the Kingdom of Aragon, Pedro de Atarés, Lord of Borja, who actually died childless.

Alfons 

Alfons de Borja (1378–1458) was born to Francina Llançol and Domingo de Borja in La Torreta, Canals, which was then situated in the Kingdom of Valencia.

Alfons de Borja was a professor of law at the University of Lleida, then a diplomat for the Kings of Aragon before becoming a cardinal. At an advanced age, he was elected Pope Callixtus III in 1455 as a compromise candidate and reigned as Pope for just 3 years, until his death in 1458.

Rodrigo 

Rodrigo Borgia (1431–1503) was born in Xàtiva, also in the Kingdom of Valencia, to Isabel de Borja i Cavanilles and Jofré Llançol i Escrivà. He studied law at Bologna and was appointed as cardinal by his uncle, Alfons Borgia, Pope Callixtus III. He was elected Pope in 1492, taking the regnal name Alexander VI. While a cardinal, he maintained a long-term illicit relationship with Vannozza dei Cattanei, with whom he had four children: Giovanni; Cesare; Lucrezia; and Gioffre. Rodrigo also had children by other women, including one daughter with his mistress, Giulia Farnese.

As Alexander VI, Rodrigo was recognized as a skilled politician and diplomat. However, he was widely criticized during his reign for his over-spending, sale of Church offices, lasciviousness, and nepotism. As Pope, he sought to acquire more personal and papal power and wealth, often ennobling and enriching the Borgia family directly.  He appointed his son, Giovanni, as captain-general of the papal army, his foremost military representative, and established another son, Cesare, as a cardinal.  Alexander used the marriages of his children to build alliances with powerful families in Italy and Spain. At the time, the Sforza family, which comprised the Milanese faction, was one of the most powerful in Europe, so Alexander united the two families by marrying Lucrezia to Giovanni Sforza. He also married Gioffre, his youngest son from Vannozza, to Sancha of Aragon of the Crown of Aragon and Naples. He established a second familial link to the Spanish royal house through Giovanni's marriage during what was a period of on-again/off-again conflict between France and Spain over the Kingdom of Naples.

It is reported that under Alexander VI's rule the Borgia hosted orgies in the Vatican palace. The "Banquet of Chestnuts" is considered one of the most disreputable balls of this kind. Johann Burchard reports that fifty courtesans were in attendance for the entertainment of the banquet guests. It is alleged not only was the Pope present, but also two of his children, Lucrezia and Cesare. Other researchers however, such as Monsignor Peter de Roo (1839–1926), have rejected the rumors of the "fifty courtesans" as being at odds with Alexander VI's essentially decent but much maligned character.

Pope Alexander VI died in Rome in 1503 after contracting a disease, generally believed to have been malaria. Two of Alexander's successors, Sixtus V and Urban VIII, described him as one of the most outstanding popes since St. Peter.

Cesare 

Cesare was Rodrigo Borgia's second son with Vannozza dei Cattanei. Cesare's education was precisely planned by his father: he was educated by tutors in Rome until his 12th birthday.  He grew up to become a charming man skilled at war and politics. He studied law and the humanities at the University of Perugia, then went to the University of Pisa to study theology. As soon as he graduated from the university, his father made him a cardinal.

Cesare was suspected of murdering his brother Giovanni, but there is no clear evidence to confirm this. However, Giovanni's death cleared the path for Cesare to become a layman and gain the honors his brother received from their father, Pope Alexander VI. Although Cesare had been a cardinal, he left the holy orders to gain power and take over the position Giovanni once held: a condottiero. He was finally married to French princess Charlotte d'Albret.

After Alexander's death in 1503, Cesare affected the choice of a next Pope. He needed a candidate who would not threaten his plans to create his own principality in Central Italy. Cesare's candidate (Pius III) did become Pope, but he died a month after the selection. Cesare was then forced to support Giuliano della Rovere. The cardinal promised Cesare that he could keep all of his titles and honors. Later, della Rovere betrayed him and became his fiercest enemy.

Cesare died in 1507, at Viana Castle in Navarre, Spain, while besieging the rebellious army of Count de Lerín. The castle was held by Louis de Beaumont at the time it was besieged by Cesare Borgia and King John's army of 10,000 men in 1507. In order to attempt to breach the extremely strong, natural fortification of the castle, Cesare counted on a desperate surprise attack. He was killed during the battle, in which his army failed to take the castle.

Lucrezia 

Lucrezia was born in Subiaco, Italy to Cardinal Rodrigo Borgia and Roman mistress Vannozza dei Catanei. Before the age of 13, she was engaged to two Spanish princes. After her father became Pope she was married to Giovanni Sforza in 1493 at the age of 13. It was a typical political marriage to improve Alexander's power; however, when Pope Alexander VI no longer needed the Sforzas, the marriage was annulled in 1497 on the dubious grounds that it had never been consummated.

Shortly afterwards she was involved in a scandal involving her alleged relationship with Pedro Calderón, a Spaniard generally known as Perotto. His body was found in the Tiber on February 14, 1498, along with the body of one of Lucrezia's ladies. It is likely that Cesare had them killed as an affair would have damaged the negotiations being conducted for another marriage. During this time rumors were also spread suggesting that a child born at this time, Giovanni Borgia, also known as the Infans Romanus (child of Rome) was Lucrezia's.

Lucrezia's second marriage, to wealthy young Prince Alfonso of Aragon, allowed the Borgias to form an alliance with another powerful family. However, this relationship did not last long either. Cesare wished to strengthen his relations with France and completely break with the Kingdom of Naples. As Alfonso's father was the ruler of the Kingdom of Naples, the young husband was in great danger. Although the first attempt at murder did not succeed, Alfonso was eventually strangled in his own quarters.

Lucrezia's third and final husband was Alfonso I d'Este, Duke of Ferrara. After her father died in 1503, she lived a life of freedom in Ferrara with her husband and children. Unfortunately, her pregnancies were difficult and she lost several babies after birth. She died in 1519, 10 days after the birth and death of her last child, Isabella Maria. She was buried in a tomb with Isabella and Alfonso.

Lucrezia was rumored to be a notorious poisoner and she became famous for her skill at political intrigue. However, some recent revisionists have looked at her in a more sympathetic light, claiming her to be a victim of her family's deceptions.

Family tree

Borgias of Velletri
One branch of the family established ifself in the city of Velletri where for many years they served in the administration of the Papal States.

Pietro Borgia, married Madonna Filomena
 Ettore Borgia, married Porzia Landi
 Camillo Borgia, Governor of Velletri
 Clemente Erminio Borgia, Governor of Velletri, married Cecilia Carboni
 Stefano Camillo Borgia (1681–1763), married Madalena Gagliardi
 Giovanni Paolo Borgia, General in the Pontifical Army, married  Alcmena Baglioni-Malatesta
 Camillo Borgia (1777–1817), Adjutant-General and Field Marshall in Murat's army, married Adelaide Quainson
 Ettore Borgia (1802–1892), Italian politician
 Alessandro Borgia (1783–1871), Lieutenant of the Grand Master of the Sovereign Military Order of Malta
 Stefano Borgia (1731–1804), cardinal
 Alessandro Borgia (1682–1764), Archbishop of Fermo
 Fabrizio Borgia (1689–1754), Bishop of Ferentino
 Angela Caterina Borgia (1694–1743), a nun and Servant of God

Other notable members of the house of Borja 
Rodrigo de Borja (b. 1349), Head of the Borja family, great-grandfather of Rodrigo (Pope Alexander VI).
Rodrigo Gil de Borja y Fennolet (lived late 14th century), Rodrigo's son, jurat of Xativa.
Jofré Llançol i Escrivà (b. circa 1390 – d. 1436 or 1437), Rodrigo Gil's son; father of Rodrigo (Pope Alexander VI) and Pedro Luis.  
Pedro Luis de Borja (1432–1458), Duke of Spoleto and Marquess of Civitavecchia.
Roderic de Borja i Escrivà (? – 1478)
Pier Luigi de Borgia, 1st duke of Gandía (1458 or 1460 – 1488 or 1491).
Giovanni Borgia, 2nd Duke of Gandia (1474 or 1476 – 1497)
Gioffre Borgia (1482–1516), son of Pope Alexander VI and younger brother of Cesare Borgia and Lucrezia Borgia. He married Sancha of Aragon, daughter of Alfonso II of Naples, obtaining as her dowry both the Principality of Squillace (1494) and the Duchy of Alvito (1497). He later married Maria de Mila y Aragón, with whom he had a son, Francesco Borgia.
Angela Borgia or Angela de Borja (c. 1486 – c. 1520–1522), lady of Sassuolo.
Enrique de Borja y Aragón (1518–1540)
Francis Borgia, 4th Duke of Gandía (1510–1572), great-grandson of Pope Alexander VI. Became an effective organizer of the Society of Jesus. Canonized by Clement X as "Saint Francis Borgia" on 20 June 1670.
Juan de Borja y Castro (1533–1606)
Tomás de Borja y Castro (1551–1610)
Juan Buenaventura de Borja y Armendia (1564* – 1628)
Íñigo de Borja (1575–1622), great-grandson of Francis and elder brother of Gaspar.
Gaspar de Borja y Velasco (1580–1645), born at Villalpando in Spain who unlike many of his relatives preferred to use the Spanish spelling "Borja". He served as Primate of Spain, Archbishop of Seville, and Archbishop and Viceroy of Naples.
Francisco de Borja y Aragón (1581–1658)
Fernando de Borja y Aragón (1583–1665)
Arturo Borja Pérez (1892–1912), Ecuadorian poet who was part of a group known as the "Generación decapitada" (Decapitated Generation).
Rosa Borja de Ycaza (1889–1964), Ecuadorian writer, essayist, playwright, sociologist, poetess, novelist, feminist and activist.
Luz Elisa Borja Martínez (1903–1927), Ecuadorian poet, pianist, painter, and sculptor.
Rodrigo Borja Cevallos (1935), former President of the Republic of Ecuador

Gallery

In popular culture 
The Borgias were infamous in their time, and have inspired numerous references in popular culture. They include novels, such as City of God: A Novel of the Borgias (1979) by Cecelia Holland, The Family (2001) by Mario Puzo, and Summer of Night (1991) by Dan Simmons, plays, operas, comics, films like The Borgia (2006), television series like Borgia (2011) and The Borgias (2011) on Showtime, and video games the likes of Assassin's Creed: Brotherhood (2010) by Ubisoft.

In series 4 of the sketch comedy TV show Horrible Histories, a song called "the Borgia Family" was featured in the section 'Radical Renaissance'. The song is a parody of the theme song to the Addams Family.

See also 
 Grandee of Spain
 List of popes from the Borgia family
 Borgia castles
 Route of the Borgias
 Borgia Apartments
 Monastery of Sant Jeroni de Cotalba
 Ducal Palace of Gandia
 Oratory of the Borgias
 Tower and walls of the Borgias
 Palace of the Borgias
 Birthplace of Pope Alexander VI

Notes

References 
 Fusero, Clemente. The Borgias. New York, Praeger Publishers, 1966.
 Grun, Bernard. The Timetables of History. New York, Simon and Schusters, 1946, pp. 218, 220, 222.
 Hale, John R. Renaissance. New York, Time-Life Books, 1965, p. 85.
 "Mad Dogs and Spaniards: An Interview with Cesare Borgia." World and Image, 1996.
 Rath, John R. "Borgia." World Book Encyclopedia. 1994 edition. World Book Inc., 1917, pp. 499–500.
 Catholic Encyclopedia, Volume 1. (Old Catholic Encyclopedia) New York, Robert Appleton Company (a.k.a. The Encyclopedia Press), 1907.
 Duran, Eulàlia: The Borja Family: Historiography, Legend and Literature
 Meyer, G.J., The Borgias: The Hidden History, 2013
 Chaplin, Danny, BORGIA, Behind The Myth: A New History of the Notorious Papal Family, 2018

External links 

 Centropolis.homestead_Library
  Borja o Borgia
  Francisco Fernández de Bethencourt – Historia Genealógica y Heráldica Española, Casa Real y Grandes de España, tomo cuarto 
  Una rama subsistente del linaje Borja en América española, por Jaime de Salazar y Acha, Académico de Número de la Real Academia Matritense de Heráldica y Genealogía
  Boletín de la Real Academia Matritense de Heráldica y Genealogía
  La familia Borja: Religión y poder. Entrevista a Miguel Batllori
  La mirada sobre los Borja (Notas críticas para un estado de la cuestión)
 The Borja Family: Historiography, Legend and Literature by Eulàlia Duran, Institut d’Estudis Catalans
 Bibliography of heraldry of family Borgia
 History of the Borgia Family
 Institut Internacional d'Estudis Borgians
  García Rivas, Manuel: Los Borja americanos: su contribución al mundo de la cultura. Revista Borja. Centro de Estudios Borjanos. Actas del Congreso Los Borja en el arte, Nº. 5. España, 2015–2016, p. 15
 Diario Borja – Borgia  Tres siglos de Historia día a día

 
1455 establishments in Europe
1748 disestablishments in Europe
Borgia
Borgia
Borgia
Borja
Borja
Borgia
Borgia
Borgia
Borgia
Route of the Borgias
Monastery of Sant Jeroni de Cotalba